In the 2014–15 football season, the Anguillaian  AFA Senior Male League was won by Kicks United FC.

Table

References 

Anguilla
Afa Senior Male League
Afa Senior Male League
AFA Senior Male League seasons